Gushue is a surname. Notable people with the surname include: 

Brad Gushue (born 1980), Canadian curler
George W. Gushue, Canadian politician
Joe Gushue (1915–1996), American referee
Raymond Gushue (1900–1980), Canadian lawyer and academic administrator
Taylor Gushue (born 1993), American baseball player